A by-election was held for the British House of Commons constituency of Chippenham, Wiltshire, England, on 22 November 1962.

Jerome, Naylor and Smith were all serving in the British Armed Forces.  The law stated that, on standing in a Parliamentary election, they would be released from the Forces; this was, therefore, a way to receive an early honourable discharge, for the cost of a lost deposit.  The practice was banned soon afterwards.

The election was won by the Conservative Party candidate, Daniel Awdry, who won a narrow majority over the Liberal Party's then Economic Spokesperson, Christopher Layton.

References

External links
 British Parliamentary By Elections: Liberal Party campaign literature from the by-election

See also
 1943 Chippenham by-election
 Chippenham (UK Parliament constituency)
 List of United Kingdom by-elections

1962 in England
Chippenham
1962 elections in the United Kingdom
By-elections to the Parliament of the United Kingdom in Wiltshire constituencies
20th century in Wiltshire